Columbia Mall is an enclosed regional shopping mall in Grand Forks, North Dakota located at the intersection of 32nd Avenue South and Columbia Road. The mall opened in 1978, and was developed by the Dayton Hudson Corporation (now Target Corporation) at a cost of roughly $20 million.

It is the largest mall within .

Today, Columbia Mall houses two department stores (JCPenney and Scheels), a 430-seat food court, and more than 70 specialty merchant spaces. GK Development, Inc. of Barrington, Illinois, is the current owner of the mall.

History

Initial concepts 
Dayton Hudson experienced fierce competition for a new mall in the city of Grand Forks in 1975. While their proposal was to build a mall at the intersection of 32nd Avenue South and Columbia Road, Inland Construction of Edina, Minnesota wanted to build a mall at 32nd Avenue South and Washington Street (one mile east of the Dayton Hudson site), which was quickly dismissed, while a group of local investors and Farber-Kelley Ltd. of Toronto advanced a proposal for a mall at DeMers Avenue and 42nd Street to be called "Marketplace West." While Marketplace West was initially preferred by the city planning department, a referendum was called to annex Dayton Hudson's proposed Columbia Mall site to the city. When it passed, the city council interpreted it as a public endorsement of the Columbia Mall project. The Marketplace West site later became the home of the Alerus Center arena and convention center.

Early tenants 
The three initial anchors included both Dayton Hudson-owned Target and Dayton's stores as well as a JCPenney store. The mall's early marketing efforts included a jingle, "Meet me at Columbia Mall," that was also produced as a television commercial and recast in a holiday version. In 2000, a Sears department store relocated from the Grand Cities Mall to the Columbia Mall, bringing the total number of anchor tenants in the mall to four. By 2001, Target relocated to a larger space on 32nd Avenue South, becoming a SuperTarget. The Dayton's location was also changed to a Marshall Field's that year following a national merger. Marshall Field's was later purchased by May Department Stores in 2004 and merged with Federated Department Stores in 2005 and subsequently converted to Macy's.

Current operations 
By 2005, GK Development added a new food court named Dakota Cafe. The American Red Cross established a temporary disaster relief operations headquarters at the shopping center in response to the August 26, 2007, tornado that struck nearby Northwood, ND. Scheels All Sports relocated into the former Target space in 2014. In 2017, Macy's shuttered its Columbia Mall location. With the closing of Sears in 2018, two anchor tenants are currently unoccupied. The future use of both spaces is uncertain.

See also
West Acres Shopping Center

Notes

External links 
Columbia Mall website
GK Development website
Columbia Mall commercial from 1980 - YouTube.com

Shopping malls in North Dakota
Shopping malls established in 1978
Buildings and structures in Grand Forks, North Dakota
Tourist attractions in Grand Forks, North Dakota